is a professional Japanese baseball player for  of Honkbal Hoofdklasse. He previously played for the Yokohama BayStars, Yokohama DeNA BayStars and Fukuoka SoftBank Hawks of Nippon Professional Baseball (NPB).

References

2. Yoki Yoshimura match details Fukuoka SoftBanks Hawks vs Yokohama DeNA BayStars  28th October 2017

3. Full statistics of Yoki Yoshimura Career

External links

 NPB.com

1984 births
Living people
People from Koga, Fukuoka
Fukuoka SoftBank Hawks players
Japanese expatriate baseball players in the Netherlands
Nippon Professional Baseball first basemen
Nippon Professional Baseball outfielders
Nippon Professional Baseball third basemen
Baseball people from Fukuoka Prefecture
Yokohama BayStars players
Yokohama DeNA BayStars players